The Men's 200 metre breaststroke competition of the 2016 European Aquatics Championships was held on 18 May 2016.

Records
Prior to the competition, the existing world, European and championship records were as follows.

Results

Heats
The heats were held on 18 May at 10:29.

Semifinals
The semifinals were held on 18 May at 18:22.

Semifinal 1

Semifinal 2

Final
The final was held on 19 May at 18:46.

References

Men's 200 metre breaststroke